In mathematics, Hermite's law of reciprocity, introduced by , states that the degree m covariants of a binary form of degree n correspond to the degree n covariants of a binary form of degree m. In terms of representation theory it states that the representations Sm Sn C2 and Sn Sm C2 of GL2 are isomorphic.

References

Invariant theory